Saint-Dizier is a subprefecture Of the Haute-Marne department in north-eastern France.

It has a population of 23,382 (2018 figure) and is a subprefecture of the department. Although Saint-Dizier is marginally the most populous commune in Haute-Marne, the préfecture (capital) resides in the somewhat smaller commune of Chaumont.

Geography

Climate

History
Named after an unknown saint (possibly Desiderius of Fontenelle), the town originated as a fortified settlement around a thirteenth-century château, eventually becoming a royal fortress to guard the French kingdom's eastern approaches. The town was besieged and captured by Charles V, Holy Roman Emperor, in the summer of 1544. A fire in 1775 destroyed two-thirds of the town center. The château was owned by the Orléans family until the French Revolution, was a base for German troops during World War II, and currently houses the Municipal Museum.

Population

Notable people
Saint-Dizier is the birthplace of
 Baroque-era musicologist André Pirro
 Organist André Isoir
 Conductor Jean-Paul Penin
 Physicist and materials scientist Christian Janot
 Former world middleweight boxing champion Marcel Thil. A street is named in his honor.

See also
Communes of the Haute-Marne department
Saint-Dizier – Robinson Air Base

References

External links

 Official website 
 Haute-Marne in Champagne Tourism: Saint-Dizier

Communes of Haute-Marne
Subprefectures in France
Champagne (province)